Kimberly Merle Schrier (born August 23, 1968) is an American politician and former physician serving as the U.S. representative from  since 2019. She is a member of the Democratic Party.

Early life and career
Schrier was born and raised in Los Angeles, California, and earned a bachelor's degree from the University of California, Berkeley, graduating Phi Beta Kappa with a degree in astrophysics. She attended the University of California Davis School of Medicine, where she earned her Doctor of Medicine degree. She continued on to a residency at the Stanford University School of Medicine.

Schrier's professional career as a pediatrician began in Ashland, Oregon, where she worked for one year before joining Virginia Mason Medical Center in Issaquah, Washington in 2001. While working at Virginia Mason, she became politically active, particularly on healthcare issues. In 2017, Schrier was dissatisfied with Congressman Dave Reichert's handling of the efforts to repeal and replace the Patient Protection and Affordable Care Act and this, coupled with her frustration with the results of the 2016 elections, led to her decision to enter politics.

U.S. House of Representatives

Elections

2018 

Schrier announced her candidacy to represent  in August 2017, a year before the jungle primary. She initially intended to challenge incumbent Dave Reichert, but the seat became open in September 2017 when Reichert announced he was retiring. She had decided to run after the 2016 election, making the expansion of Medicare and the Affordable Care Act the centerpiece of her campaign.

No Democrat had ever been elected to represent the district and Reichert had been seen as a relatively safe incumbent, but his decision to retire left the seat as a potential Democratic pickup in an election year already leaning toward the Democratic Party.

Schrier advanced from the top-two primary, narrowly defeating attorney Jason Rittereiser, and advancing to face Republican nominee Dino Rossi in the general election. The 8th district campaign attracted $25 million in spending, making it the most expensive in state history and one of the costliest nationally in 2018, including controversial attack ads from the Rossi campaign. One such ad, paid for by the Washington State Republican Party, nicknamed Schrier "Dr. Tax" and depicted her holding a large stack of $20 bills. The ad was perceived as antisemitic, fulfilling stereotypes about Jewish greed.

Schrier won the general election with 52% of the vote.

2020 

Schrier ran for reelection. She advanced from the top-two primary in first place and faced the second-place finisher, Republican U.S. Army veteran and Amazon senior project manager Jesse Jensen. Schrier won the general election with 51.7% of the vote.

Tenure
During Donald Trump's administration, Schrier voted in line with the president's stated position 6.6% of the time. As of June 2022, Schrier had voted in line with Joe Biden's stated position 100% of the time.

Committee assignments

Committee on Agriculture
Subcommittee on Biotechnology, Horticulture, and Research
Subcommittee on Nutrition, Oversight, and Department Operations
Committee on Education and Labor
Subcommittee on Civil Rights and Human Services
Subcommittee on Early Childhood, Elementary and Secondary Education
Committee on Energy and Commerce
Subcommittee on Health

Caucus memberships 

 New Democrat Coalition

Electoral history

Personal life
Schrier and her husband, David Gowing, have a son and live in Sammamish, Washington. Her grandparents were Jewish immigrants from Europe who arrived in the U.S. before World War II. Schrier has Type 1 diabetes.

See also
List of Jewish members of the United States Congress
Women in the United States House of Representatives

References

Footnotes

External links

 Congresswoman Kim Schrier official U.S. House website
 Campaign website

|-

1968 births
21st-century American women politicians
21st-century American politicians
American pediatricians
American Jews from Washington (state)
Women pediatricians
Democratic Party members of the United States House of Representatives from Washington (state)
Female members of the United States House of Representatives
Jewish members of the United States House of Representatives
Jewish women politicians
Living people
People from Issaquah, Washington
People from Sammamish, Washington
People with type 1 diabetes
Politicians from Los Angeles
Women in Washington (state) politics
University of California, Davis alumni
21st-century American Jews
Physicians from Washington (state)